The Performance Based Research Fund (PBRF) is a New Zealand tertiary education funding process, assessing the research performance of tertiary education organisations (TEOs) and then funding them on the basis of their performance.  The PBRF will provide  million to support the tertiary sector in 2018/19.

The PBRF model has three elements to:
 reward and encourage the quality of researchers— 55 percent of the fund 
 reflect research degree completions—25 percent of the fund 
 reflect external research income— 20 percent of fund
All New Zealand Tertiary Education Organisations (TEOs) who are approved by the New Zealand Qualifications Authority (NZQA) to award degrees, and also receive  Student Achievement Component (SAC) funding from the Tertiary Education Commission (TEC) are entitled to participate in the PBRF Quality Evaluation process.

Quality evaluation

The major element, the Quality Evaluation, is held periodically. The first was held in 2003, the second, a partial round in which not all staff were required to submit portfolios, was held in 2006, the third in 2012 and the latest full round was held in 2018. Due to COVID-19, the next round was delayed by a year and is due to be held in 2025. 

Each Quality Evaluation assesses the quality of research conducted at TEOs, and funding is allocated accordingly. Quality is determined by an assessment of research degree completion numbers, the amount of external research funding an institution achieves, and an evaluation of the individual research performance of all academic staff teaching on degrees or employed to conduct research.

Each academic staff member is required (with some exceptions) to submit an Evidence Portfolio which records their research outputs, contribution to research environment, and peer esteem. They are then assessed as A, B, C or R category. The A indicates international standing, B national, C local and R research inactive or active at a lower level. 

From 2006 two new categories, C(NE) and R(NE) were introduced, for new and emerging researchers who have not yet had the benefit of a full six year census period. Each staff member is assigned a numerical grade (in 2006 5 for an A, 3 for a B, 1 for a C or C (NE), and 0 for R and R (NE)). This is used to calculate an overall score. Since the numerical scores assigned for the 2003 assessment and that for the 2006 assessment differed, the results of the two assessments are not entirely comparable, despite the 2006 assessment being designed to be a partial round.

In assessing individuals rather than groups, PBRF differs from the otherwise similar Research Assessment Exercise (RAE) in the United Kingdom.

New Zealand universities up to 2012
In 2012, The Victoria University of Wellington was ranked first for research quality. The research rankings up to that year are below. 

However these figures are based on the AQS(N) reported average, which measured research quality against the number of full-time equivalent staff receiving an A, B, or C grade. This measure was discontinued for the 2018 round.

Note: the number of staff and the quality score are weighted for full-time equivalents.
The national average includes non-university TEOs.
The 2012 rankings used the "new" Average Quality Score, which excluded all R rated portfolios, whereas the 2003 and 2006 rankings use the previous Average Quality Score.

Other tertiary institutions (2012)
Other tertiary institutions scoring above 2.0 in the 2012 PBRF round including Polytechnics, Institutes of Technology and Private Training Establishments are below.

2018 Results (Universities) 
These results are based on the AQS(S) - average quality, based on the number of teaching and research staff in a given tertiary education organisation, and is now the primary measure of research quality.  These figures were reported by the TEC in 2019

Other tertiary institutions (2018)
Other tertiary institutions scoring above 2.0 in the 2018 PBRF round including Polytechnics, Institutes of Technology and Private Training Establishments are below.

References

External links
 Performance Based Research Fund

Research management
Research in New Zealand